Stockholm is a 2013 Spanish romantic drama film directed by Rodrigo Sorogoyen. It stars Javier Pereira and Aura Garrido.

Premise
A man ('He') tries to get a woman ('She') he meets at a party to like him. She refuses, but he does not give up until he manages to change her mind. After they spend the night together, she discovers he is not like she thought.

Cast

Reception 
Jonathan Holland of The Hollywood Reporter deemed the film to be "an unsettling, minimalist meditation on the hidden dangers of teen romance", otherwise signalling its director "as someone who's already marked out his own distinctive style".

Andrea G. Bermejo of Cinemanía rated Stockholm 4 out 5 stars, summing it up to be a "little film with a surprise and a great Aura Garrido".

Accolades 

|-
| align = "center" rowspan = "3" | 2013
| rowspan=3 | 16th Málaga Film Festival
| Best Director
| Rodrigo Sorogoyen
| 
| rowspan = "3" | 
|-
| Best Actress
| Aura Garrido
| 
|-
| Best New Screenwriter
| Isabel Peña and Rodrigo Sorogoyen
| 
|-
| align = "center" rowspan = "7" | 2014 
| rowspan=4 | 1st Feroz Awards
| colspan=2 | Best Drama
| 
| rowspan = "4" | 
|-
| Best Screenplay
| Isabel Peña and Rodrigo Sorogoyen
| 
|-
| Best Main Actress
| Aura Garrido
| 
|-
| colspan=2 | Best Film Poster
| 
|-
| rowspan=3 | 28th Goya Awards
| Best New Director
| Rodrigo Sorogoyen
| 
| rowspan = "3" | 
|-
| Best Actress
| Aura Garrido
| 
|-
| Best New Actor
| Javier Pereira
| 
|}

See also 
 List of Spanish films of 2013

References

External links
 
 

2013 romantic drama films
2013 films
Films shot in Madrid
Spanish romantic drama films
2010s Spanish films
2010s Spanish-language films
Caballo Films films